Chrysopolis (meaning "golden city"), can refer to:

 Üsküdar, an Asian suburb of Istanbul, Turkey
 Chrysopolis (sidewheeler) a side-wheel steamboat that ran between Sacramento and San Francisco in the later 19th century
 Chrysopolis, California, a ghost town in Inyo County, California
 Chrysopolis (Thrace), the medieval name of the ancient city of Eion at the mouths of the Strymon river